Siddhant Behl is an Indian actor, writer and theatre artist. He debuted in Bollywood as a lead actor with the 2016 film Jugni, starring Sugandha Garg and directed by Shefali Bhushan.

Career 
Behl started his career in theatre, which he believes helped him improve his skills. He was a part of the popular theatre group, Act One, based in New Delhi. Behl played the role of Mastana, a singer, in the film Jugni.

Personal life 
Behl completed his schooling from Delhi Public School and graduation from Hindu College. Behl is a sports person and enjoys playing cricket, basketball and soccer.

Filmography

References

External links

 

Living people
Indian male film actors
Male actors in Hindi cinema
Year of birth missing (living people)